The North Town Hall is one of two historic 19th-century town halls in Chelmsford, Massachusetts.  Located at 31 Princeton Street, near the North Chelmsford village center, it is a -story wood-frame structure with Greek Revival styling.  It was built in 1853, and was used, alternating with the Centre Town Hall, for town meetings until 1885.  It was thereafter used as a community meeting hall and polling station, a role it served until 1967, when the town moved its school administration offices there.  In 2011 the building underwent a full restoration, and is again used as a community center.

The building was listed on the National Register of Historic Places in 2015.

See also
National Register of Historic Places listings in Middlesex County, Massachusetts

References

Town halls in Massachusetts
Chelmsford, Massachusetts
Community centers in the United States
Government buildings completed in 1853
City and town halls on the National Register of Historic Places in Massachusetts
National Register of Historic Places in Middlesex County, Massachusetts
Greek Revival architecture in Massachusetts